DXDB (594 AM) Radyo Bandilyo is a radio station owned and operated by the Roman Catholic Diocese of Malaybalay. The station's main studio is located at the Ground Floor, Communications Media Center Bldg., San Isidro Cathedral, Murillo St. cor. San Isidro St., Brgy. 1, Malaybalay; its alternate studio is located at the Ground Floor, San Agustin Parish Church, Sayre Highway, Valencia; and its transmitter is located at Brgy. Kalasungay, Malaybalay.

History
The station was established on July 1, 1971, under the call letters DXBB on 600 kHz, after a series of test broadcasts conducted since May 26. Under the helm of the Director of Communications Media Center Fr. Joseph Suico and Bishop Msgr. Francisco F. Claver, it became among the pioneer radio stations in the province. On September 23, 1972, despite the closure order from then President Ferdinand Marcos upon declaration of Martial Law, it remained on the air. By this time, it aired educational programs as part of the station's agreement with the Federation of Free Farmers. On November 18, 1976, DXBB went off the air after its operations were suspended by then Defense Secretary Juan Ponce Enrile. Its equipment and facilities were surrendered to the military.

A few months after the EDSA People Power Revolution, then Malaybalay Bishop Gaudencio Cardinal Rosales (current Archbishop Emeritus of the Roman Catholic Archdiocese of Manila) began efforts on reviving the station. On July 15, 1991, DXBB returned on air, this time under the call letters DXDB on 594 kHz. Since then, it carried the branding Dan-ag sa Bukidnon.

References

Radio stations established in 1971
Catholic radio stations
Radio stations in Bukidnon